Majiapu is a station on Line 4 of the Beijing Subway.

Station Layout 
The station has an underground island platform.

Exits 
There are 3 exits, lettered A, B, and C. Exit A is accessible.

References

External links
 

Beijing Subway stations in Fengtai District
Railway stations in China opened in 2009